HMS Firebrand was the mercantile schooner Lord Lennox, a French prize taken in 1799 and renamed. In 1803 her master and owner was J.S.Lloyd, and her trade was London—Rouen. She had undergone a good repair in 1799.

The Royal Navy purchased her in 1804 for use as a fire ship but sold her in 1807.

Disposal: The "Principal Officers and Commissioners of His Majesty's Navy" offered Firebrand and several other vessels for sale on 17 March 1807 at Sheerness.

Her purchasers returned her to her prior name. Lord Lennox re-entered Lloyd's Register in 1808 with Whiteside, master, Hedgecock, owner, and trade London–Cadiz. She then traded between London and Lisbon and was last listed in the Register of Shipping in 1815.

Citations

References
 

Captured ships
Ships of the Royal Navy
Age of Sail merchant ships
Merchant ships of the United Kingdom
1790s ships